Franz Pfnür (21 November 1908 – 21 September 1996) was a German alpine skier who competed in the 1936 Winter Olympics.

He was born in Schellenberg.

In 1936 he won the gold medal in the alpine skiing combined event.

As a reward, Pfnür was later invited to coffee with the Führer Adolf Hitler at his mountain retreat in Obersalzberg. He also joined the SS.

References

External links
 Profile

1908 births
1996 deaths
German male alpine skiers
Olympic alpine skiers of Germany
Alpine skiers at the 1936 Winter Olympics
Olympic gold medalists for Germany
Olympic medalists in alpine skiing
Medalists at the 1936 Winter Olympics